The American Champion Two-Year-Old Male Horse is an American Thoroughbred horse racing honor awarded annually in Thoroughbred flat racing. It became part of the Eclipse Awards program in 1971.

The award originated in 1936 when the Daily Racing Form (DRF) began naming an annual champion. In the same year, the Baltimore-based Turf and Sports Digest magazine instituted a similar award. Starting in 1950, the Thoroughbred Racing Associations (TRA) began naming its own champion. The following list provides the name of the horses chosen by these organizations. Whenever there were different champions named, the horses are listed side by side with the one chosen as champion by the Daily Racing Form noted with the letters (DRF), the one chosen by the Thoroughbred Racing Associations by the letters (TRA) and the one chosen by Turf and Sports Digest by the letters (TSD).

The Daily Racing Form, the Thoroughbred Racing Associations, and the National Turf Writers Association all joined forces in 1971 to create the Eclipse Award.

Champions from 1887 through 1935 were selected retrospectively by a panel of experts as published by The Blood-Horse magazine.

Honorees

Eclipse Awards

Daily Racing Form, Turf & Sport Digest and Thoroughbred Racing Association Awards

Daily Racing Form and Turf & Sport Digest Awards

The Blood-Horse retrospective champions

Notes

References
 The Eclipse Awards at the Thoroughbred Racing Associations of America, Inc.

External links
Thoroughbred Heritage: champions list

Horse racing awards
Horse racing in the United States